Sir James Wylie, 1st Baronet (Russian: Я́ков Васи́льевич Ви́ллие Yakov Vasilyevich Villiye; 13  November 1768 – 2 March 1854), was a Scottish physician who served as a battlefield surgeon and as a court physician in the Russian Empire from 1790 until his death in 1854, and as President of the Russian  Imperial Medical and Surgical Academy from 1808 to 1838. He is considered one of the organizers of military medicine in Russia by some by whom the role of the indigenous Russian Nikolay Ivanovich Pirogov as the "father of combat medicine"
may appear to be less valued.

Biography 
James Wylie was born on 13 or 20 November 1768 in Tulliallan by Kincardine-on-Forth, Scotland. He was the second of five children of Janet Meiklejohn and her husband, a church minister named William Wylie. After leaving school Wylie was apprenticed to the local doctor. In 1786 he matriculated at the University of Edinburgh, and studied there until 1789, and later applied his learning from the medical teaching there and the design of the recently opened Edinburgh Royal Infirmary. He finally received the degree of Doctor of Medicine from King's College, Aberdeen, only in 1794.

In 1790 Wylie was invited to Russia by John Rogerson, from Dumfries, who was a court physician to Catherine the Great. He entered the Russian service as senior surgeon in the Eletsky Infantry Regiment. Wylie was surprised that only officers received medical assistance and other ranks were thus succumbing to infections or malaria. Wylie participated in the Polish–Russian War of 1792 and in military operations against the Kościuszko Uprising, culminated in the Battle of Praga, as battlefield surgeon. And on 12 January 1793, Wylie (known in Russia as Yakov Viliye) was given a special commendation for his treatment of the (malaria) fever "with great success using the pharmaceutical he himself had invented and named Solution Mineralis," which contained small below toxic doses or arsenic. He also performed amazing surgery removing a bullet from a soldier's spine. In 1794 he was promoted to staff surgeon.

Retired after the end of the war, Wylie practiced in Saint Petersburg. His reputation grew quickly and he attracted many society clients, and made a re-acquaintance with Dr Rogerson, now English (sic) Physician to Her Majesty. Successful operations on the Danish ambassador, Baron Otto von Bloom, and later an emergency tracheotomy saving the life of Count Ivan Kutaisov, the Tsar's closest confidant and cousin, Paul I made him Surgeon-in-Ordinary in 1799. When Paul I was murdered by a group of ex-military assassins on 23 March 1801, Wylie embalmed the body and gave a certificate that the cause of death was apoplexy.

In 1804 Alexander I invited Wylie back to military service as Medical Inspector of the Imperial Guard. On 2 December 1805 he accompanied the Tsar during the Battle of Austerlitz. It was noted that Wylie was one of the few in the heat of the battle with the Tsar throughout the battle. In 1808 Wylie was elected President of the Imperial Medical and Surgical Academy in Saint Petersburg and was there for 30 years.

Wylie was appointed Inspector General for the Army Board of Health in 1806, and became Director of the Medical Department of the Imperial Ministry of War in 1812. On 7 September 1812 at Borodino he performed about 80 operations in the field. He also attended the mortally wounded General Prince Pyotr Bagration, Commander-in-Chief of the 2nd Russian Army. On 27 August 1813 at Dresden he amputated the mortally wounded General Moreau's legs, which were shattered by a cannon shot as he was talking to the Tsar.

Wylie accompanied Alexander I during his visit to England in 1814, and was knighted by the Prince Regent, becoming Sir James Wylie, on 2 July 1814, at the special request of the Tsar. Wylie was created a baronet in the name and on behalf of George III. On 2 February 1824 his title was recognized by the State Council of the Russian Empire, making him the only baronet in the country's history.

Wylie attended Alexander I at the Congress of Verona in 1822, and was with the Tsar during his last tour to the South of Russia, which was ended by Alexander's death at Taganrog on 1 December 1825.

The Scottish doctor continued to enjoy imperial confidence under Alexander's brother and successor, Nicholas I. During the Russo-Turkish War (1828–29), Wylie by then aged 60 took part in several battles leading the medical corps. In 1841 he was promoted to the rank of Actual Privy Councilor (II grade of the Table of Ranks).

Wylie had become a wealthy man when he died at Saint Petersburg on 2 March 1854, and was buried at the Volkovo Lutheran Cemetery, with full imperial honours.

Contribution to Russia's military medicine 

During the Napoleonic Wars in 1812, Russian military doctors worked as part of a coherent system, with a high level of organization in evacuating the wounded from the battlefield to field hospitals for operations and recuperation. This complex mechanism was set up by Wylie, who came to live in Russia in the late 1700s and was named physician to the Tsar’s household. Wylie made it his personal goal to ensure that enlisted men as well as officers received medical treatment for wounds instead of being left to die on the battlefield. Through concerted efforts on his part, the number of non-combat losses in peacetime in the Russian army fell to ten percent by the mid-19th century. A huge drop in modern terms, this was an even greater achievement in an era when every fourth European soldier died of disease.

Wylie also published a number of works on field surgery, pharmacopoeia, contagious diseases, cholera and plague.

In 1823, Wylie, as Director of the Medical Department, started the Voenno-Meditsinskii Zhurnal (Journal of Military Medicine), one of Russia's most significant periodicals. Nowadays it is the oldest Russian peer-reviewed scientific journal.

Awards

Russian Empire 
 Monogrammed diamond ring of Alexander I (1804)
 Order of Saint Vladimir, 2nd class (1812)
 Order of Saint Anna, 1st class (1814, since 1821 with diamonds)
 Tobacco box with diamonds and Emperor's monogram (1826)
 Tobacco box with Emperor's enamelled portrait (1828)
 Decoration «For Impeccable Service — XXXV years» (1828)
 Order of Saint Alexander Nevsky (1828, since 1838 with diamonds)
 Decoration «For Impeccable Service — XL years» (1834)
 Order of Saint Vladimir, 1st class (1840)

Austria 
 Order of Leopold, 2nd class

Bavaria 
 Merit Order of the Bavarian Crown, Commander

France 
 Legion of Honour, Chevalier (1807 or 1809)

Prussia 
 Order of the Red Eagle, 2nd class (1835)

Württemberg 
 Order of the Crown, Commander, (1818)

Memory 

Wylie's Russian will was challenged by his family and there was held to be an intestacy in relation to funds he had left in the British public funds. Some £50,000 was shared among his wider family as he had no wife nor direct heirs. But Wylie had successfully bequeathed a considerable fortune of 1.5 million roubles for the construction of a hospital attached to the Imperial Medical and Surgical Academy. The ensemble of its five buildings was finished in 1873. Before the October Revolution of 1917 it was known as the Mikhailovskaya Baronet Wylie Clinical Hospital. Nowadays the former hospital hosts several departments of the S.M. Kirov Military Medical Academy.

A monument to Sir James Wylie designed by architect Andrei Stakenschneider and sculptor David Jensen was erected in 1859 in front of the main building the Medical and Surgical Academy in Saint Petersburg. In 1949 — 1951 by decision of the S.M. Kirov Military Medical Academy headship it was removed to the courtyard of the former Clinical Hospital built with Wylie's funds.

Wylie was depicted by Leo Tolstoy as a character in his epic novel War and Peace.

Works 
 On the American Yellow Fever, St. Petersburg, 1805 [in Russian] 
 Pharmacopœia Castrensis Ruthenica, 1808-1812-1818-1840 [in Latin]
 Practical Observations on the Plague, Moscow, 1829 [in Russian]
 Rapport officiel à Sa Majesté Impériale sur la valeur comparée des méthodes thérapeutiques appliquées dans les hôpitaux militaires et à Saint-Pétersbourg aux sujets atteints de la maladie épidémique dite le choléra morbus, avec des observations pratiques sur la nature du fléau et sur ce que l'on apprend par l'ouverture des cadavres, St. Petersburg, 1831 [in French]
 Description de l'ophthalmie qui a sévi parmi les troupes, St. Petersburg, 1835 [in French]

References 

 Robert Hutchison, A Medical Adventurer. Biographical Note on Sir James Wylie, Bart., M.D., 1758 to 1854. Proceedings of the Royal Society of Medicine, 06/1928; 21(8):1406–1408. 
 A. A. Novik, V. I. Mazurov, P. A. Semple, The life and times of Sir James Wylie Bt., MD., 1768–1854, body surgeon and physician to the Czar and chief of the Russian Military Medical Department. Scottish Medical Journal, 1996 Aug; 41(4):116-20.
 V. P. Tyukin, L. P. Churilov, Yakov Vasilyevich Wylie: Half a Century at Head of the Russian Medicine, Medicina v XXI veke, No. 4 (5), 2006, pg 100 — 107 [in Russian]
 E. I. Zaytsev, Yakov Vasilyevich Wylie (1768–1854), Vestnik Khirurgii im. I. I. Grekova, vol. 168, No. 4, 2009, pg 9 — 10 [in Russian]
 Mary McGrigor, The Tsar's Doctor: The Life and Times of Sir James Wylie (Edinburgh: Birlinn General, 2010)
 L.P. Churilov, Y. I. Stroyev, V. P. Tyukin, Hero of the Patriotic War of 1812 Baronet Yakov Vasilyevich Wylie and the Russian Medicine, Zdorovye — osnova chelovecheskogo potentsiala: problemy i puti ih resheniya, vol. 7, No. 2, 2012, pg 974 — 995 [in Russian]

1768 births
1854 deaths
18th-century Scottish people
18th-century Scottish medical doctors
19th-century Scottish medical doctors
Alumni of the University of Aberdeen
Alumni of the University of Edinburgh
Scottish surgeons
Surgeons from the Russian Empire
Russian people of the Napoleonic Wars
Baronets in the Baronetage of the United Kingdom
Recipients of the Order of St. Anna, 1st class
Recipients of the Order of St. Vladimir, 2nd class
Recipients of the Order of St. Vladimir, 1st class
Chevaliers of the Légion d'honneur
People from Kincardine, Fife
Paul I of Russia